Tocina is a city located in the province of Seville, Spain. According to the 2005 census (INE), the city has a population of 9114 inhabitants. Its name in Moorish times was Tushēna.

Tocina is twin city with Żejtun in Malta.

References

External links
Tocina - Sistema de Información Multiterritorial de Andalucía

Municipalities of the Province of Seville